Cooper v Phibbs [1867] UKHL 1 is an English contract law case, concerning the doctrine of mistake.

Facts

An uncle told his nephew, not intending to misrepresent anything, but being in fact in error, that he (the uncle) was entitled to a fishery. The nephew, after the uncle's death, acting in the belief of the truth of what the uncle had told him, entered into an agreement to rent the fishery from the uncle's daughters. However, the fishery actually belonged to the nephew himself. After the uncle died, the lease was renewed through Mr Cooper’s aunt, via her three daughters, Cooper’s cousins, and Mr Phibbs acting as their agent. The aunt, three sisters, and Mr Cooper, had all assumed that they were entitled to the land through a right of inheritance. In fact, Cooper was truly entitled to an equitable residual interest, because the uncle in his will had granted Cooper a life tenancy. When the sisters asked for the next rental payment, this had transpired and Mr Cooper sought a declaration that he was the owner and that the lease was not enforceable.

Judgment
The House of Lords held that the contract was voidable at Mr Cooper’s instance, on the basis of a mistake that it was possible for the aunt and sisters to lease the land to Mr Cooper. Since Mr Cooper was the true beneficial owner, in equity, it was impossible for a lease to be granted to him in law.

Lord Cranworth said the following.

Lord Westbury agreed, and expressed the issues as follows:

Lord Colonsay concurred.

Significance
The case has been seen as an example of how a contract will be unenforceable if there is a mistake by both parties about the possibility, in law, to perform a contract. This doctrine of mistake in equity was expanded upon by Denning LJ in Solle v Butcher, which emphasised that mistakes in equity would render a contract voidable (at the instance of the claimant), rather than void. However, mistake in equity was held to have been abolished in The Great Peace. This remains a point of controversy.

Notes

References

English contract case law
1867 in British law
1867 in case law
House of Lords cases